Berry is an unincorporated community in Cooper Township, Sangamon County, Illinois, United States. In the Geographic Names Information System, Berry also has variant names of Clarksville, Custer, Mortaraville, and South Fork.

References

Unincorporated communities in Sangamon County, Illinois
Unincorporated communities in Illinois